Louie Soares  (born 8 January 1985) is a former professional footballer who played as a midfielder.

He notably played as a professional for Reading, Bristol Rovers, Barnet, Aldershot Town, Southend United and Grimsby Town, as well as in Non-league football for Tamworth, Hayes & Yeading United, Ebbsfleet United, Alfreton Town, Basingstoke Town, Oxford City, Hungerford Town, Slough Town, Hampton & Richmond Borough, Biggleswade Town, Staines Town and Bracknell Town. He was capped twice by Barbados and scored one goal.

Club career

Early career
Soares' career began as a trainee right-back at his home town club, Reading, who also allowed him to make a loan spell to Tamworth, where he made six appearances (including five starts). At Reading, Soares was tutored by his club captain, Graeme Murty, as he was the senior right back at the club.

Barnet
At the end of the 2004–05 season, Soares was released by Reading, he signed fr Bristol Rovers however this move didn't work out and he eventually signed for Barnet. He was granted a contract extension in January 2006 where he made 25 appearances, scoring once in the whole of the 2005–06 season. Despite this, Barnet allowed him to leave at the end of that season, whereupon he joined Aldershot.

Aldershot
He signed for the Shots in May 2006 having worked with previously with Martin Kuhl at Reading. Exciting prospect who will be looking to enhance his career at Aldershot. While at Aldershot he made his first International appearance. During his 4-year spell at Aldershot he made over 148 appearances and scored 17 goals.

Southend United
On 21 July 2010 Soares signed a pre contract agreement with Southend United and his registration was completed when the club's transfer embargo was lifted on 6 August 2010. Soares scored his first goal for the club on 5 October 2010 in a 3–1 win over Barnet in the Football League Trophy. In May 2011 he was one of five players told they were to be released by the club.
going on to make 32 appearances before being released in the summer.

Hayes & Yeading United
He subsequently joined Conference National side Hayes & Yeading United on a free transfer. He made 31 appearances and scored 15 goals.

Grimsby Town
On 31 January 2012, transfer deadline day, Soares signed for Grimsby Town on an 18-month permanent contract, being unveiled by the club at midday. In September 2012 after failing to hold down a regular place in the Grimsby midfield for the remainder of the 2011–12 and beginning of the 2012–13 season Soares was made available for loan. Soares joined Ebbsfleet United on a month's loan on 28 September 2012. On 26 October Soares extended his loan period by a further month. On 17 January 2013 Soares joined Alfreton Town on loan for the remainder of the 2012–13 season.

Soares played 18 times for Alfreton, scoring twice, he returned to Grimsby at the end of the season and was released on 2 May 2013.

Non-League
In July 2013 he joined Woking on trial. In August 2013 he joined former club Hayes & Yeading United on trial and scored the winner in the club's final pre-season match, a 2–1 win away at Arlesey Town, eventually signing with the club on a permanent deal.

In December 2013 Soares signed for Basingstoke Town on a non-contract basis. He scored on his debut in a win against Farnborough. He later had spells with Oxford City and Hungerford Town before signing with Slough Town in June 2018. Soares joined Hampton & Richmond Borough for the 2019–20 season. After 21 appearances and two goals, he left the club in January and re-joined Slough. On 4 February 2020, Soares along with his teammate Scott Davies joined Southern League Premier Division Central side Biggleswade Town on loan. The following week, he joined Staines Town on dual registration.

Soares joined Bracknell Town on 26 February 2020.

International career
Soares was called up by Barbados for the 2007 Caribbean Nations Cup tournament, and became the first Aldershot player, whilst playing for the club, to be capped when he played against Trinidad and Tobago on 12 January 2007.

Career statistics

Personal life
His brother, Tom is also a footballer with League One side AFC Wimbledon.

Honours
Aldershot
Conference National: 2008
Conference League Cup: 2008

Grimsby Town
Lincolnshire Senior Cup: 2012–13

References

External links

1985 births
Sportspeople from Reading, Berkshire
Living people
Association football midfielders
People with acquired Barbadian citizenship
Barbadian footballers
Barbados international footballers
English footballers
English sportspeople of Barbadian descent
Reading F.C. players
Tamworth F.C. players
Bristol Rovers F.C. players
Barnet F.C. players
Aldershot Town F.C. players
Southend United F.C. players
Hayes & Yeading United F.C. players
Grimsby Town F.C. players
Ebbsfleet United F.C. players
Alfreton Town F.C. players
Basingstoke Town F.C. players
Oxford City F.C. players
Hungerford Town F.C. players
Slough Town F.C. players
Hampton & Richmond Borough F.C. players
Biggleswade Town F.C. players
Staines Town F.C. players
Bracknell Town F.C. players
National League (English football) players
English Football League players
Southern Football League players
Isthmian League players
Black British sportspeople
Footballers from Berkshire